The BMW R1200S is a luxury sports motorcycle produced by BMW Motorrad from 2006 to 2007.

Much of the weight saving was down to a new trellis-type frame which replaced the massive alloy frame of the R1100S. The R1200S thus had superior handling, improved braking, higher power output, greater ground clearance, and sport ergonomics. Although the instrumentation was updated, the bike retained the unconventional BMW-system indicator switches (one on either side). Factory options included front and rear Öhlins shock absorbers, switchable ABS, a light weight Akrapovič muffler, expandable locking luggage, heated grips, a solo tail piece, a Tire-pressure monitoring system and a wider 6" rear wheel to accommodate a size 190 tire.

Despite these refinements, overall the earlier R1100S has perhaps proved the more successful design. Motor Cycle News said of the R1200S: "As an oddball track motorcycle it works, but as an accomplished all-rounder it falls short of the standards set by the R1100S that preceded it." However, the owners’ comments attached to this article viewed the R1200S much more favourably. 

The 2006 BMW R1200S was reported to have a 0-60 time of 3.5 seconds, and a quarter mile time of 11.1 seconds.

HP2 Sport
In 2008 the R1200S was superseded by the double overhead camshaft HP2 Sport. At 178 kg (dry) and 128 hp, the HP2 is even lighter and more powerful than the R1200S upon which it is based; (and compared to the R1100S, the HP2 is 30 kg lighter and 30 hp more powerful). The HP2's dohc engine was the most powerful "oilhead" design before BMW adopted liquid cooling for some of its flat twins in 2013.

References

R1200S
Motorcycles powered by flat engines
Shaft drive motorcycles
Motorcycles introduced in 2006